Victoria Hospital is a provincial government funded hospital for the Raymond Mhlaba Local Municipality area in Alice, Eastern Cape in South Africa.

The hospital departments include endocrinology, emergency department, paediatric ward, maternity ward, obstetrics/gynecology, outpatients department, surgical services, medical services, operating theatre & CSSD Services, pharmacy, anti-retroviral (ARV) treatment for HIV/AIDS, post trauma counselling Services, X-ray services, physiotherapy, NHLS Laboratory, oral health care providers, laundry services, kitchen services and mortuary.

References
 Eastern Cape Department of Health website - Amathole District Hospitals

Hospitals in the Eastern Cape
Raymond Mhlaba Local Municipality